The men's hammer throw at the 2015 World Championships in Athletics was held at the Beijing National Stadium on 22 and 23 August.

Returning champion and current world leader Paweł Fajdek looked to be the favorite.  In the first round it was David Söderberg who took the lead.  The second round saw Dilshod Nazarov and Sergej Litvinov get off 77 metre throws to take the top two spots.  Then in the third round, Fajdek let out 80.64 and calmly walked out of the ring.  Nobody else could get in that range, but Fajdek launched 80.88 on his next throw for the win.  Nazarov got off a 78.55 in the fifth round to move into second, but that was matched exactly by Wojciech Nowicki on his final throw.  With an exact tie for the silver medal, the second best throw became the tiebreaker, Nazarov's 78.06 in the fourth round being superior to Nowicki's third round 77.20.	

The world championships also incorporated the 2015 IAAF Hammer Throw Challenge and Fajdek was the series winner.

Records
Prior to the competition, the records were as follows:

Qualification standards

Schedule

Results

Qualification
Qualification: Qualifying Performance 77.00 (Q) or at least 12 best performers (q) advanced to the final.

Final
The final was started at 18:30.

References

Hammer throw
Hammer throw at the World Athletics Championships